Fitzroy North Primary School (No. 1490) is a state school in the inner-city suburb of Fitzroy North in Melbourne, Australia. The school is one of the oldest schools in Melbourne.

There are approximately 490 students. A mid-high proportion, less than one third of students, have language other than English backgrounds.

History
The Fitzroy North Primary School No. 1490 was constructed in 1875. Opened in 1875, Fitzroy North Primary School was known as Alfred Crescent School.

The average class size in 2008 was 25.2, with Prep-2 average being 24.8.

The school's Out of School Hours Care is fully registered under the National Child Care Accreditation.

References

External links 
 

Public primary schools in Melbourne
Educational institutions established in 1875
1875 establishments in Australia
Fitzroy, Victoria
Buildings and structures in the City of Yarra